Tom Simpkin (born 7 August 1990) is a former professional Australian rules footballer who played for the St Kilda Football Club in the Australian Football League (AFL).

Playing career 

Simpkin was recruited with the 29th pick in the 2009 rookie draft from the Geelong Falcons, and was promoted to St Kilda's senior list in August 2010. 
  He made his AFL debut in Round 11 of the 2011 AFL season against . He was delisted at the conclusion of the 2015 season.

Personal life 
His brother Jonathan is a premiership player with Hawthorn in 2013 & Box Hill in 2013.

References

External links

 
 

1990 births
Living people
Australian rules footballers from Victoria (Australia)
St Kilda Football Club players
Geelong Falcons players
Sandringham Football Club players